Randle, as a surname or a given name, may refer to:

Surname:
 Betsy Randle (born 1955), American actress
 Bill Randle (1923–2004), American disc jockey, lawyer and university professor
 Brian Randle (born 1985), American NBA coach and basketball player in the Israeli Basketball Premier League
 Chasson Randle (born 1993), American college basketball player
 Ervin Randle (born 1962), National Football League linebacker and brother of John Randle
 Florence Randle, American photographer
 Frank Randle (1901–1957), English comedian
 Harry Randle (1906–1976), English footballer
 Ian Randle (born 1940), Jamaican publisher
 Jack Randle (1902–1990), English footballer
 Jerome Randle (born 1987), American college and professional basketball player
 John Randle (born 1967), retired National Football League defensive tackle and member of the Pro Football Hall of Fame
 John Randle (physician) (1855–1928), West African doctor active in politics in Lagos, now in Nigeria, in the colonial era.
 John Niel Randle (1917–1944), British captain and posthumous recipient of the Victoria Cross
 Joseph Randle (born 1991), National Football League running back
 Julius Randle (born 1994), American basketball player
 Kevin D. Randle (born 1949), ufologist
 Lenny Randle (born 1949), retired Major League Baseball player
 Lynda Randle, African American singer of southern gospel
 Mary Jo Randle, English actress
 Michael Randle (born 1933), British peace activist who helped the Soviet spy George Blake escape from prison
 Philip Randle (1926–2006), medical researcher
 Rodger Randle, American politician from the 1970s on
 Roger Randle (born 1974), New Zealand rugby union footballer
 Rueben Randle (born 1991), National Football League wide receiver
 Sonny Randle (born 1936), sportscaster and former National Football League player and college coach
 Tate Randle (born 1959), retired National Football League cornerback
 Theresa Randle (born 1964), American actress
 Valerie Randle, Welsh materials engineer and professor at Swansea University
 Vicki Randle (born 1954), American singer, musician and composer; first and only female member of The Tonight Show Band

Given name:
 Randle Ayrton (1869–1940), British actor, producer and director
 Randle Chowning (born 1950), American singer-songwriter best known as the founder of the Ozark Mountain Daredevils
 Randle Cotgrave (died 1634?), English lexicographer
 Randle Wilbraham Falconer (1816–1881), British medical doctor and writer
 Randle Holme, name shared by four family members who were painters and genealogists in Chester, Cheshire, England, from the late 16th to early 18th centuries

Fictional characters:
 Randle McMurphy, protagonist of Ken Kesey's novel One Flew Over the Cuckoo's Nest and its film adaptation
 John Randle, man in Body Bags (film)

See also
 Randle, Washington, an unincorporated community
 Randles, a list of people with the surname
 Randall (disambiguation)
 Randel
 Randell